The Sheikh Nasser Bin Muhammad Al-Sabah Chair in International Relationships is a professorship or chair in the Institute for Middle East and Islamic Studies, which forms part of the School of Government and International Affairs at Durham University. The chair is named after the former Prime Minister of Kuwait Sheikh Nasser Mohammed Al-Ahmed Al-Sabah, who originally endowed the chair in 2011.

List of Al-Sabah Professors

2011–Present Professor Anoush Ehteshami

See also
Durham University
Centre for the Advanced Study of the Arab World

References

Professorships at Durham University
Professorships in international relations